Eduard Caudella (22 May (or 3 June) 1841 – 15 April 1924) was a Romanian opera composer, also a violin virtuoso, conductor, teacher and critic. He studied with Henri Vieuxtemps, and taught at the Iași Conservatory.

Operas
Harţă Răzeşul (1872)
Olteanca (1880)
Hatmanul Baltag (1884)
Beizadea Epaminonda (1885)
Fata răzeşului (1885)
Petru Rareş (1889)

Selected other works
Violin Concerto No. 1 (1915)
Dochia, orchestral ballad
Souvenirs of the Carpathians (Amintiri din Carpati)

References

External links
Eduard Caudella at compendium.ro

1841 births
1924 deaths
Romanian classical composers
Romanian opera composers
Musicians from Iași
Burials at Eternitatea cemetery
Male classical composers